Siva  Temple is a Siva temple in Punganur in Chittoor district in Andhra Pradesh (India).

Vaippu Sthalam
It is one of the shrines of the Vaippu Sthalams sung by Tamil Saivite Nayanar Appar.

Presiding deity
The presiding deity is Shiva. He is known as Kukkudesvarar.

Location
This place is also known as Kukkudechuram. From Chittoor, after reaching Palamaner this temple can be reached in Madhanapalli road.

References

Hindu temples in Chittoor district
Shiva temples in Andhra Pradesh